Sheikh Lutfur Rahman (1881 – 30 March 1975) was a Bangladeshi serestadar, an officer responsible for record-keeping at the Gopalganj civil court in British India. His son Sheikh Mujibur Rahman was the founder of Bangladesh. Lutfar was a religious Muslim. He was also the paternal grandfather of the Sheikh Hasina.

Early life 
Rahman was born in 1881 to a Bengali Muslim family in the village of Tungipara located in Gopalganj, Faridpur district, Bengal Presidency. He had Iraqi Arab ancestry through his father Sheikh Abdul Hamid, who was a direct descendant of 15th-century Muslim preacher Sheikh Awwal of Baghdad.

Lutfar Rahman was married to his paternal first-cousin Sayera Khatun, the daughter of his father's brother Sheikh Abdul Majid. He left home to find a job and worked in the Dewani court, today Gopalganj civil court.

1971 Liberation War 
During the Bangladesh Liberation War, Lutfar Rahman and his wife Sheikh Sayera Khatun, along with the family of Sheikh Mujibur Rahman were put under arrest by the Pakistan Army. Initially, Lutfar Rahman and his wife were in Khulna at their younger son Naser's house in Khulna, but was later sent away to their ancestral home in Gopalganj. On 8 April 1971, the Pakistan Army looted ornaments and other valuables from the house and later bulldozed and set fire to it. The soldiers also shot dead four relatives and two servants of the household. The elderly couple were rendered homeless until the local Awami League activists built them a temporary shed which was also destroyed by the Pakistan Army after 20 days. They were then sent away to Dhaka where they were put under arrest with their elder son's family.

Death and legacy 
Rahman died on 30 March 1975. He was buried in Tungipara, Gopalganj district, Bangladesh. Sheikh Lutfar Rahman Bridge over Madhumati River connecting Gopalganj-Pirojpur Highway. The foundation stone of the bridge was laid on 23 December 2000 by Sheikh Hasina. The construction was stopped in 2001 by the 4-party government. The construction work resumed in 2009 when Bangladesh Awami League returned to power in 2009. The bridge was inaugurated in January 2015 by Sheikh Hasina. Sheikh Lutfar Rahman Adarsha Government College is a government college in Kotalipara, Gopalganj.

Descendants

References 

1975 deaths
Sheikh Mujibur Rahman family
People from Gopalganj District, Bangladesh
1881 births
Bangladeshi people of Arab descent